Penistone Grammar School (PGS) is a co-educational secondary school and sixth form located in Penistone, South Yorkshire, England.

Founded in 1392, it is the 45th oldest extant school in England with its most notable alumnus being Nicholas Saunderson, the probable inventor of Bayes theorem, in the 18th century.  The school has undergone many expansions, requiring the erection of several buildings, and now houses over 1,700 pupils from age 11 to 18. PGS' Ofsted overall rating is grade 2 ('Good'), following an inspection in November 2017.

History
The school was founded as the Free Grammar School of Penistone ('Penistone' often spelt 'Peniston') in 1392, when it is recorded that a gift of land was made by Thomas Clarel, Lord of the Manor at Penistone, to John Del Rodes "and others". The land was situated in the town centre on a site opposite St. John the Baptist Church and across the road from the old Cloth Hall (built much later).Penistone Grammar School's foundation deed:
Thomas Clarel, Dominus (that is Lord) de Peniston in 1392, granted to John del Rodes and others a piece of land in the Kirk-flatt, sicut se extendit et jacet inter quinque lapides per manus predicti Thomas Clarel pro metis positos, with license to grave turf on the Moors of Penistone.In 1443 the Free Grammar School of Penistone received further bequests and in 1547, after the dissolution of the chantries, the school continued as the free school for the children of Penistone. Following further endowments, the school was rebuilt in 1714. In 1893, the school withdrew from its town centre site to a position about half a mile north-west of the town centre, at Weirfield House. The school remains on this site.

The school was originally an all-boys grammar school with a boarding provision. Girls were admitted for the first time in 1907 (though mixed-sex classes were not until 1911). Fulford was the last headmaster to see boarders, with PGS becoming a day school in 1921.

On 28 October 1911, under the tenure of Mr Fulford, the Fulford building opened (though not called that at the time), at a cost of £8,000 (plus £780 for furnishings and equipment). Several other buildings were erected, and in 1974, PGS purchased the former Penistone Union Workhouse, later named 'Netherfields', which became the school's sixth form.

It became fully comprehensive in 1969, with partial selection (for more distant pupils) from 1957. The comprehensive school initially retained its grammar school name and traditions such as the house system and speech night. These traditions were gradually scaled back. In 2011, the school restored its traditional house system and uniform, and entirely demolished all buildings but Weirfield and the adjacent Stables, which was converted into flats. A new building opened that same year.

The school motto was traditionally "Disce Aut Discede" ("Learn or leave"), with the school colours traditionally being red and black. It used the coat of arms of the founding family, the Clarels, which shows six martlets, as its logo. In 2003 the school changed its motto to "Learning and Achieving Together". It rebranded again in 2010 with the motto "Never Stop Flying", a reference to martlets having no legs so always being in flight, changing the logo and school ties to show a single stylised martlet in flight.

Present day
A £35 million 'state-of-the-art' school building opened on 2 May 2011, with a complete demolition of the old buildings, except for Fulford, the Stables, and Weirfield. Fulford, erected in 1909, was ultimately demolished in early 2014 after much protest from past students and locals.

After taking over from Glynis Gower, headteacher of 5 years, in 2007, Joanne Higgins stood down in November 2017 with Paul Crook taking her place as headteacher. He was formerly a teacher of PE and a deputy head.

The sixth form at Penistone currently has 300 students in attendance. Penistone Grammar School is the only school in the Local Education Authority of Barnsley to have a sixth form alongside its secondary provision.

In 2017, Penistone Grammar School's then headteacher, Jo Higgins, introduced a controversial, zero tolerance style 'Values Driven Expectations' behaviour management scheme, under which a pupil could be reprimanded for forgetting a pen or leaving their shirt untucked.

After internal remodelling in 2018, work started on a £4.3 million two-storey extension in 2019, providing an additional 250 places at the school. The building was opened to students in September 2020, and is linked to the main school by a walkway through the science department. The block is home to the modern foreign languages department and several science classrooms.

As of 2022, Penistone Grammar School is the only secondary school in the Metropolitan Borough of Barnsley to not have academy status, remaining under the control of the Local Authority.

The school maintains expansive playing fields, with a martlet-covered bridge over Huddersfield Road connecting the building and fields.

Academic results

Secondary 
PGS' secondary results are the best of any school in the Barnsley local authority. In 2022, over 90% of pupils passed English and maths, with the same figure for the sciences. 76% of pupils achieved a grade 5 (strong pass) or higher in English and maths, whilst 42% of students got two 7 (A) grades in science.

Sixth Form 
The sixth form has been within the top 10% of providers nationally for over five consecutive years. The majority (55%) of grades secured are A* or A, and in 2022, the average result was an A-, with over half of students progressing to elite Russell Group universities.

Penistone Grammar School Foundation 
The Penistone Grammar School Foundation is a charity (number 529458) established in January 1957, but registered in 1965. It owns much of the school's old site and its current estate, and generates income for the school.

Houses 
The school operates a traditional house system.

List of headmasters

Notable Old Penistonians

 Prof Nicholas Saunderson (1682–1739) – Mathematician and Lucasian Professor at Cambridge University 1711–1739
 Alec Glassey (1887–1970) – Liberal MP for East Dorset 1929–1931
 Geoffrey Allan Crossley, CMG (1920–2009) – Diplomat and British Ambassador to Colombia and the Holy Sea
 Noel Moore (1928–2008) – Civil Servant who oversaw the decimalisation project
 Neil Robinson (1929–2009) – CoE Priest; Archdeacon of Suffolk 1987–1994
 Prof Alan Mercer (1931–2014) – Professor of Operational Research, founding member of Lancaster University's Department of Management Science
 Heather Armitage (1933–) – British gold medal sprinter
 Roland Boyes (1937–2006) – Labour MP for Houghton and Washington (1992–1997); MEP for Durham 1979–1984; Photographer
 Prof David Hey (1938–2016) – Historian
 Anne Campbell (1940–) – Labour MP for Cambridge, 1992–2005
 John Haigh (1941–2021) – Lecturer of Mathematics at the University of Sussex
 Prof Jean Bacon (1942–) – Professor of Computer Science at the University of Cambridge
 Paul Copley (1944–) – Actor and voice-over artist
 Katherine Brunt (1985–) – England Women's Cricketer
 Marc Roberts (1990–) –  Professional Footballer
 John Stones (1994–) – England Footballer

References

External links
PGS Archive
History of PGS
PGS performance at BBC News
pgsonline
OFSTED report
 

People educated at Penistone Grammar School
1392 establishments in England
Educational institutions established in the 14th century
Penistone
Community schools in Barnsley
Secondary schools in Barnsley